Mesolaelaps is a genus of mites in the family Laelapidae. The small macropod species Hypsiprymnodon moschatus, the musky rat kangaroo, is recorded as a to host species of this mite.

Species
 Mesolaelaps anomalus (Hirst, 1926)
 Mesolaelaps antipodiana (Hirst, 1926)
 Mesolaelaps australiensis (Hirst, 1926)
 Mesolaelaps bandicoota (Womersley, 1956)
 Mesolaelaps lagotisinus (Hirst, 1931)
 Mesolaelaps sminthopsis (Womersley, 1954)

References

Laelapidae